Nicolae Simioncenco (born July 15, 1952) is a Romanian sprint canoer who competed in the mid-1970s. He finished fourth in the K-4 1000 m event at the 1976 Summer Olympics in Montreal.

References
Sports-Reference.com profile

1952 births
Canoeists at the 1976 Summer Olympics
Living people
Olympic canoeists of Romania
Romanian male canoeists
Place of birth missing (living people)